The superior pancreaticoduodenal artery is an artery that supplies blood to the duodenum and pancreas.

Structure 
It is a branch of the gastroduodenal artery, which most commonly arises from the common hepatic artery of the celiac trunk, although there are numerous variations of the origin of the gastroduodenal artery. The pancreaticoduodenal artery divides into two branches as it descends, an anterior and posterior branch. These branches then travel around the head of the pancreas and duodenum, eventually joining with the anterior and posterior branches of the inferior pancreaticoduodenal artery. The inferior pancreaticoduodenal artery is a branch of the superior mesenteric artery. These arteries, together with the pancreatic branches of the splenic artery, form connections or anastomoses with one another, allowing blood to perfuse the pancreas and duodenum through multiple channels.

The artery supplies the anterior and posterior sides of the duodenum and head of pancreas, with the anterior branch supply the anterior surface and similarly for the posterior.

At 42 letters, the posterior superior pancreaticoduodenal artery is also the artery with the longest name in the human body.

Additional images

References

External links
  - "Stomach, Spleen and Liver: Contents of the Hepatoduodenal Ligament"
 
 

Arteries of the abdomen